Giovanni Conti may refer to:

 Giovanni Conti (died 1332), Dominican archbishop of Pisa and Nicosia
 Giovanni Conti (cardinal) (1414–1493), Italian Roman Catholic bishop and cardinal
 Giovanni Maria Conti (1617–1670), Italian painter
 Giovanni Conti (painter) (died 1909), Italian painter
 Giovanni Conti (politician) (1882–1957), Italian politician
 Giovanni Conti (windsurfer) (born 1960), Sammarinese windsurfer